Romines Mills is an unincorporated community in Harrison County, in the U.S. state of West Virginia.

History
A post office called Romines Mills was established in 1833, and remained in operation until 1907. The post office most likely was named after the local Romine family.

References

Unincorporated communities in Harrison County, West Virginia
Unincorporated communities in West Virginia